The Ministry of Health (MoH; ,) is the government ministry responsible for governing healthcare, the healthcare industry, public health and health-related NGOs in Cambodia.  The Ministry governs and regulates the activity of medical professionals, hospitals and clinics in the country.  , the Minister of Health was Mam Bunheng.  The Ministry maintains 24 provincial health departments, and its main offices are located in Phnom Penh.

Directorates and departments
The Ministry of Health is organized into three administrative directorates, with departments and associated agencies as shown below:
 Directorate General for Administration and Finance - administration, personnel, budget and finance
 Directorate General for Health
Department of Planning and Health Information (DPHI)
Department of Health Prevention (DHP)
Department of Hospital Services (DPS) 
Department of Human Resource (DHR)
Department of Essential Drug and Food (DDF) 
Department of Communicable Disease Control (CDC) 
Department of International Cooperation (DIC) 
Department of Internal Audit (DIA)
International Relations Bureau
 Directorate General for Inspection

Affiliated organizations
Organizations under the purview of the ministry include:
National Malaria Center of Cambodia
University of Health Sciences - Cambodia
Regional schools of medical care
 National Centre for HIV/AIDS Dermatology and STDs (NCHADS)
Other national programs and institutes
 National Reproductive Health Program (NRHP)

National hospitals
National hospitals of Cambodia include:
 Calmette Hospital
 Kantha Bopha Hospital (KBH)
Jayavarmann VII Hospital
Kantha Bopha I Hospital
Kantha Bopha II Hospital
Kantha Bopha IV Hospital
Kantha Bopha V Hospital 
 National Maternal and Child Health Centre (NMCHC)
 National Pediatric Hospital (NPH)
 PADH
 Khmer-Soviet Friendship Hospital (KSFH)
 PKSMH 
 National Center for Tuberculosis and Leprosy Control (CENAT)

See also
Royal Government of Cambodia
Health in Cambodia
Institut Pasteur du Cambodge

References

External links
Ministry of Health
National Pediatric Hospital
SihanoukVille, Cambodia Hospital

Government ministries of Cambodia
Medical and health organisations based in Cambodia
Cambodia
Phnom Penh
Ministries established in 1993
1993 establishments in Cambodia